22 teams took part in the league with FC Torpedo Moscow winning the championship.

Round 1

Subgroup 1

Table

Results

Subgroup 2

Table

Results

Round 2

Places 1–6

Table

Results

Places 7–12

Table

Results

Places 13–18

Table

Results

Places 19–22

Table

Results

Top scorers
20 goals
 Zaur Kaloyev (Dinamo Tbilisi)

19 goals
 Gennady Krasnitsky (Pakhtakor Tashkent)

17 goals
 Viktor Sokolov (Lokomotiv Moscow)

13 goals
 Anatoli Ilyin (Spartak Moscow)
 Tengiz Melashvili (Dinamo Tbilisi)

12 goals
 Feliks Arutyunyan (Spartak Yerevan)
 Igor Chislenko (Dinamo Moscow)
 Gennadi Gusarov (Torpedo Moscow)
 Aleksei Levchenko (SKA Rostov-on-Don) 
 Valery Lobanovsky (Dynamo Kyiv)
 Vladimir Streshny (CSKA Moscow)
 Anatoli Vasilyev (Admiralteyets Leningrad)

Promotion/relegation play-off

|}

References

 Soviet Union - List of final tables (RSSSF)

Soviet Top League seasons
1
Soviet
Soviet